Len Blackley (2 March 1915 – 27 March 1983) was an  Australian rules footballer who played with Fitzroy in the Victorian Football League (VFL).

Notes

External links 
		

1915 births
1983 deaths
Australian rules footballers from Victoria (Australia)
Fitzroy Football Club players
Brunswick Football Club players